Pyongyang University may refer to:

 Kim Il-sung University
 Pyongyang University of Science and Technology, North Korea's first privately funded university
 Pyongyang University of Foreign Studies
 Pyongyang University of Music and Dance